Billboard Top Hits: 1976 is a compilation album released by Rhino Records in 1991, featuring ten hit recordings from 1976.

The track lineup includes six songs that reached the top of the Billboard Hot 100 chart. The remaining four songs each reached the top 5 on the Hot 100.

Track listing

Track information and credits were taken from the CD liner notes.

References

1991 compilation albums
Billboard Top Hits albums
Rhino Records compilation albums